Peter Langenfeld (December 8, 1837 – ?) was an American politician, teacher, and businessman.

Born in Prussia, Langenfeld emigrated to the United States settling first in Menasha, Wisconsin, then Iron Ridge, Wisconsin, and finally in Theresa, Wisconsin. He was a teacher and secretary of the town insurance company. Langenfeld served as town clerk and justice of the peace. In 1878, Langenfeld served in the Wisconsin State Assembly and was a Democrat.

Notes

1837 births
Year of death unknown
People from Iron Ridge, Wisconsin
Prussian emigrants to the United States
Businesspeople from Wisconsin
Educators from Wisconsin
People from Menasha, Wisconsin
People from Theresa, Wisconsin
Democratic Party members of the Wisconsin State Assembly